The following page lists all power stations in Tanzania.

Hydroelectric

Thermal

Wind

See also 

 List of power stations in Africa
 List of largest power stations in the world

References

External links
 Overview of Electrical Power In Tanzania
 Understanding Tanzania’s Independent Power Projects

Tanzania
 
Power stations